Glenn B. Lautzenhiser (March 7, 1906 – February 23, 2003) was a college football player.

Early years
Glenn was born on March 7, 1906, in Akron Ohio to Willis Lautzenhiser and Louisa Bruse. He attended old Tech High School in Atlanta, Georgia.

College
Lautzenhiser attended the University of Georgia, competing in football, basketball, baseball and track from 1926 to 1928. Lautzenhiser was an All-Southern right tackle, a member of the "Dream and Wonder team" of 1927. One account reports Lautzenhiser played with a "tremendous ferocity." He was co-captain of the 1928 team along with guard Roy Jacobson. He quit the team in 1929 to devote more time to studies.

After college
After his career at Georgia, Lautzenhiser worked for Coca-Cola, Goodyear Tires and a plastics company in Memphis, Tennessee. He was honored in 2000 as Georgia's oldest living letterman. He worked for Goodyear for more than 40 years.

References

1906 births
2003 deaths
Georgia Bulldogs football players
Georgia Bulldogs basketball players
Goodyear Tire and Rubber Company people
All-Southern college football players
Georgia Bulldogs baseball players
American football tackles
Players of American football from Ohio
Players of American football from Akron, Ohio
American men's basketball players